Fuzzy extractors are a method that allows biometric data to be used as inputs to standard cryptographic techniques, to enhance computer security. "Fuzzy", in this context, refers to the fact that the fixed values required for cryptography will be extracted from values close to but not identical to the original key, without compromising the security required. One application is to encrypt and authenticate users records, using the biometric inputs of the user as a key.

Fuzzy extractors are a biometric tool that allows for user authentication, using a biometric template constructed from the user's biometric data as the key, by extracting a uniform and random string  from an input , with a tolerance for noise. The security of the process is also ensured when an adversary modifies . Once the fixed string  has been calculated, it can be used, for example, for key agreement between a user and a server based only on a biometric input.

History
One precursor to fuzzy extractors was the so-called "Fuzzy Commitment", as designed by Juels and Wattenberg. Here, the cryptographic key is decommited using biometric data.

Later, Juels and Sudan came up with Fuzzy vault schemes. These are order invariant for the fuzzy commitment scheme and use a Reed–Solomon error correction code. The code word is inserted as the coefficients of a polynomial, and this polynomial is then evaluated with respect to various properties of the biometric data.

Both Fuzzy Commitment and Fuzzy Vaults were precursors to Fuzzy Extractors.

Motivation
In order for fuzzy extractors to generate strong keys from biometric and other noisy data, cryptography paradigms will be applied to this biometric data. These paradigms:

(1) Limit the number of assumptions about the content of the biometric data (this data comes from a variety of sources; so, in order to avoid exploitation by an adversary, it's best to assume the input is unpredictable).

(2) Apply usual cryptographic techniques to the input. (Fuzzy extractors convert biometric data into secret, uniformly random, and reliably reproducible random strings.)

These techniques can also have other broader applications for other type of noisy inputs such as approximative data from human memory, images used as passwords, and keys from quantum channels. Fuzzy extractors also have applications in the proof of impossibility of the strong notions of privacy with regard to statistical databases.

Basic definitions

Predictability
Predictability indicates the probability that an adversary can guess a secret key.

Min-entropy
Min-entropy indicates the worst-case entropy.

Statistical distance
Statistical distance is a measure of distinguishability.

Definition 1 (strong extractor)
Setting  as a strong randomness extractor.

Strong extractors can extract at most  bits from an arbitrary -source.

Secure sketch

Definition 2 (secure sketch)
An  secure sketch is a pair of efficient randomized procedures (SS – Sketch; Rec – Recover) such that:

(1) The sketching procedure SS takes as input  and returns a string .

(2) Correctness:  If   then .

For any , if , then .

Fuzzy extractor

Definition 3 (fuzzy extractor)
An  fuzzy extractor is a pair of efficient randomized procedures (Gen – Generate and Rep – Reproduce) such that:

(1) Gen, given , outputs an extracted string  and a helper string .

So, when  , then .

So Fuzzy extractors output almost uniform random sequences of bits which are a prerequisite for using cryptographic applications (as secret keys). As long as this distance is sufficiently small, the security will remain adequate.

Secure sketches and fuzzy extractors

The following lemma formalizes this.

Lemma 1 (fuzzy extractors from sketches)
Assume (SS,Rec) is an  secure sketch and let Ext be an average-case  strong extractor.  Then the following (Gen, Rep) is an  fuzzy extractor:

(1) Gen : set  and output .

(2) Rep : recover  and output .

Proof:

from the definition of secure sketch (Definition 2), ;

and since Ext is an average-case -strong extractor;

Corollary 1
If (SS,Rec) is an   secure sketch and Ext is an  strong extractor,then the above construction (Gen, Rep) is a  fuzzy extractor.

The cited paper includes many generic combinatorial bounds on secure sketches and fuzzy extractors.

Basic constructions
The first step in constructing a secure sketch is determining the type of errors that will likely occur and then choosing a distance to measure.

Hamming distance constructions
When there is no risk of data being deleted and only of its being corrupted, then the best measurement to use for error correction is the Hamming distance. There are two common constructions for correcting Hamming errors, depending on whether the code is linear or not. Both constructions start with an error-correcting code that has a distance of  where  is the number of tolerated errors.

Code-offset construction
When using a  general code, assign a uniformly random codeword  to each , then let  which is the shift needed to change  into . This means . The only way to improve upon this result would be to find a code better than Reed–Solomon.

Syndrome construction
To correct , find a vector  such that ; then .

Set difference constructions
It is useful that BCH codes can be decoded in sub-linear time.

Pin sketch construction
Let .  To correct , first find , then find a set v where , and finally compute the symmetric difference, to get . While this is not the only construction that can be used to set the difference, it is the easiest one.

Edit distance constructions
When data can be corrupted or deleted, the best measurement to use is edit distance. To make a construction based on edit distance, the easiest way is to start with a construction for set difference or hamming distance as an intermediate correction step, and then build the edit distance construction around that.

Other distance measure constructions
There are many other types of errors and distances that can be used to model other situations.  Most of these other possible constructions are built upon simpler constructions, such as edit-distance constructions.

Improving error tolerance via relaxed notions of correctness
It can be shown that the error tolerance of a secure sketch can be improved by applying a probabilistic method to error correction with a high probability of success. This allows potential code words to exceed the Plotkin bound, which has a limit of  error corrections, and to approach Shannon's bound, which allows for nearly  corrections. To achieve this enhanced error correction, a less restrictive error distribution model must be used.

Random errors

Input-dependent errors
For this model, errors do not have a known distribution and can be from an adversary, the only constraints being  and that a corrupted word depends only on the input  and not on the secure sketch. It can be shown for this error model that there will never be more than  errors, since this model can account for all complex noise processes, meaning that Shannon's bound can be reached; to do this a random permutation is prepended to the secure sketch that will reduce entropy loss.

Computationally bounded errors
This model differs from the input-dependent model by having errors that depend on both the input  and the secure sketch, and an adversary is limited to polynomial-time algorithms for introducing errors. Since algorithms that can run in better-than-polynomial-time are not currently feasible in the real world, then a positive result using this error model would guarantee that any errors can be fixed. This is the least restrictive model, where the only known way to approach Shannon's bound is to use list-decodable codes, although this may not always be useful in practice, since returning a list, instead of a single code word, may not always be acceptable.

Privacy guarantees
In general, a secure system attempts to leak as little information as possible to an adversary. In the case of biometrics, if information about the biometric reading is leaked, the adversary may be able to learn personal information about a user. For example, an adversary notices that there is a certain pattern in the helper strings that implies the ethnicity of the user. We can consider this additional information a function . If an adversary were to learn a helper string, it must be ensured that, from this data he can not infer any data about the person from whom the biometric reading was taken.

Correlation between helper string and biometric input
Ideally the helper string  would reveal no information about the biometric input . This is only possible when every subsequent biometric reading  is identical to the original .

We can consider this information to be a function . The best possible solution is to make sure an adversary can't learn anything useful from the helper string.

Gen(W) as a probabilistic map
A probabilistic map  hides the results of functions with a small amount of leakage . The leakage is the difference in probability two adversaries have of guessing some function, when one knows the probabilistic map and one does not. Formally:

 

If the function  is a probabilistic map, then even if an adversary knows both the helper string  and the secret string , they are only negligibly more likely figure something out about the subject that if they knew nothing. We can consider  to be any correlation between the biometric input and some physical characteristic of the person. Setting  in the above equation changes it to:

 

Uniform fuzzy extractors

Uniform secure sketches
Since secure sketches imply fuzzy extractors, constructing a uniform secure sketch allows for the easy construction of a uniform fuzzy extractor. Since randomness extractors output a string that appears to be from a uniform distribution, they hide all information about their input.

Applications
Extractor sketches can be used to construct -fuzzy perfectly one-way hash functions. When used as a hash function the input  is the object you want to hash. The  that  outputs is the hash value. If one wanted to verify that a  within  from the original , they would verify that . Such fuzzy perfectly one-way hash functions are special hash functions where they accept any input with at most  errors, compared to traditional hash functions which only accept when the input matches the original exactly. Traditional cryptographic hash functions attempt to guarantee that is it is computationally infeasible to find two different inputs that hash to the same value. Fuzzy perfectly one-way hash functions make an analogous claim. They make it computationally infeasible two find two inputs that are more than  Hamming distance apart and hash to the same value.

Protection against active attacks
An active attack could be one where an adversary can modify the helper string . If an adversary is able to change  to another string that is also acceptable to the reproduce function , it causes  to output an incorrect secret string . Robust fuzzy extractors solve this problem by allowing the reproduce function to fail, if a modified helper string is provided as input.

Robust fuzzy extractors

One method of constructing robust fuzzy extractors is to use hash functions. The  function produces the helper string  by appending the output of a secure sketch  to the hash of both the reading  and secure sketch . Formally:

Formally:

If  and  then  else 

If  has been tampered with, it will be obvious, because  will fail on output with very high probability. To cause the algorithm to accept a different , an adversary would have to find a  such that . Seeing  would provide an adversary with no useful information. Since, again, hash function are one-way functions, it is computationally infeasible for an adversary to reverse the hash function and figure out . Similarly seeing  (even though it should never see it) would provide an adversary with no useful information, as an adversary wouldn't be able to reverse the hash function and see the biometric input.

References

Further reading

External links
 

Biometrics
Coding theory
Cryptographic algorithms